Brent is an extinct town in Pemiscot County, in the U.S. state of Missouri. The GNIS classifies it as a populated place.

The community once had a schoolhouse, Brent School, now defunct. Brent was named after the proprietor of a local sawmill.

References

Ghost towns in Missouri
Former populated places in Pemiscot County, Missouri